The Evermann's snake eel (Ophichthus lithinus) is an eel in the family Ophichthidae (worm/snake eels). It was described by David Starr Jordan and Robert Earl Richardson in 1908. It is a marine, tropical eel which is known from the western Pacific Ocean. It inhabits inshore soft bottoms.

References

Ophichthus
Taxa named by David Starr Jordan
Taxa named by Robert Earl Richardson
Fish described in 1908